Aleksandr Sergeyevich Zobnin (born 22 February 1989) is a retired Russian professional footballer. He is the older brother of Roman Zobnin.

After retirement he became a civil pilot for S7 Airlines.

Club career
He made his professional debut in the Russian Football National League in 2008 for FC Zvezda Irkutsk.

References

External links
 

Russian footballers
1989 births
Living people
FC Zvezda Irkutsk players
Association football forwards
FC Tom Tomsk players
FC Avangard Kursk players
FC Baikal Irkutsk players
Russian aviators